The Solutrean  industry is a relatively advanced flint tool-making style of the Upper Paleolithic of the Final Gravettian, from around 22,000 to 17,000 BP. Solutrean sites have been found in modern-day France, Spain and Portugal.

Details 
The term Solutrean comes from the type-site of "Cros du Charnier", dating to around 21,000 years ago and located at Solutré, in east-central France near Mâcon. The Rock of Solutré site was discovered in 1866 by the French geologist and paleontologist Henry Testot-Ferry. It is now preserved as the Parc archéologique et botanique de Solutré.

The industry was named by Gabriel de Mortillet to describe the second stage of his system of cave chronology, following the Mousterian, and he considered it synchronous with the third division of the Quaternary period. The era's finds include tools, ornamental beads, and bone pins as well as prehistoric art.

Solutrean tool-making employed techniques not seen before and not rediscovered for millennia. The Solutrean has relatively finely worked, bifacial points made with lithic reduction percussion and pressure flaking rather than flintknapping. Knapping was done using antler batons, hardwood batons and soft stone hammers. This method permitted the working of delicate slivers of flint to make light projectiles and even elaborate barbed and tanged arrowheads. Large thin spearheads; scrapers with edge not on the side but on the end; flint knives and saws, but all still chipped, not ground or polished; long spear-points, with tang and shoulder on one side only, are also characteristic implements of this industry. Bone and antler were used as well.

The Solutrean may be seen as a transitional stage between the flint implements of the Mousterian and the bone implements of the Magdalenian epochs. Faunal finds include horse, reindeer, mammoth, cave lion, rhinoceros, bear and aurochs. Solutrean finds have also been made in the caves of Les Eyzies and Laugerie Haute, and in the Lower Beds of Creswell Crags in Derbyshire, England (Proto-Solutrean). The industry first appeared in what is now Spain, and disappears from the archaeological record around 17,000 BP.

Solutrean hypothesis in North American archaeology 

The Solutrean hypothesis argues that people from Europe may have been among the earliest settlers of the Americas. Its notable recent proponents include Dennis Stanford of the Smithsonian Institution and Bruce Bradley of the University of Exeter. This hypothesis contrasts with the mainstream archaeological consensus that the North American continent was first populated by people from Asia, either by the Bering land bridge (i.e. Beringia) at least 13,500 years ago, or by maritime travel along the Pacific coast, or by both. The idea of a Clovis-Solutrean link remains controversial and does not enjoy wide acceptance. The hypothesis is challenged by large gaps in time between the Clovis culture and Solutrean eras, a lack of evidence of Solutrean seafaring, lack of specific Solutrean features and tools in Clovis technology, the difficulties of the route, and other issues.

In 2014, the autosomal DNA of a male infant (Anzick-1) from a 12,500-year-old deposit in Montana was sequenced. The skeleton was found in close association with several Clovis artifacts. Comparisons showed strong affinities with DNA from Siberian sites, and virtually ruled out any close affinity of Anzick-1 with European sources. The DNA of the Anzick-1 sample showed strong affinities with sampled Native American populations, which indicated that the samples derive from an ancient population that lived in or near Siberia, the Upper Paleolithic Mal'ta population.

Physical characteristics 
Examination of physical remains from the Solutrean period has determined that they were of a slightly more gracile type than the preceding Gravettian culture. Males were rather tall, with some skeletons being up to 179 cm tall.  Volume 4 of the Portuguese Magazine of Archaeology from 2001 examined a Solutrean female individual whose physical remains are described as "having postcranial elements that  derive from a relatively small and gracile individual". The teeth of Solutrean individuals are described as being similar in appearance to those belonging to the people of the Gravettian.

Gallery

See also 

 Franco-Cantabrian region
 Gravettian
 Last Glacial Maximum

References

External links

 Clovis and Solutrean: Is There a Common Thread? by James M. Chandler
 Stone Age Columbus BBC TV programme summary
 "America's Stone Age Explorers" transcript of 2004 NOVA program on PBS
 Images of Solutrean artifacts
 Radical theory of first Americans places Stone Age Europeans in Delmarva 20,000 years ago Washington Post article from 28 February 2012
 Picture gallery of the Paleolithic (reconstructional palaeoethnology), Libor Balák at the Czech Academy of Sciences, the Institute of Archaeology in Brno, The Center for Paleolithic and Paleoethnological Research

Gravettian
Archaeological cultures of Southwestern Europe
Archaeological cultures of Western Europe
Archaeological cultures in France
Archaeological cultures in Portugal
Archaeological cultures in Spain
Saône-et-Loire
Upper Paleolithic cultures of Europe
Industries (archaeology)